The Hawke's Bay cricket team, representing the Hawke's Bay region of New Zealand, played first-class cricket between 1883–84 and 1920–21, and competed in the Plunket Shield in the 1914–15 and 1920–21 seasons. The side has continued to appear in minor cricket and now competes in the Hawke Cup competition.

First-class history
In their first match at first-class level, against Wellington at the Basin Reserve in February 1884, Hawke's Bay were dismissed for just 32 in their second innings thanks to Joseph Firth's remarkable return of 8 for 13 from 13 four-ball overs. In their next match, in 1884–85, they beat Wellington at Napier Recreation Ground by eight wickets.

They lost their next three matches, all against Wellington, before trouncing Taranaki in two matches in 1891–92. In the first of these matches they dismissed Taranaki for 70 and 39 and the game was over in one day. In the second match Hawke's Bay made 128 then dismissed Taranaki for 35 and 29.

Hawke's Bay's matches remained low-scoring affairs. They did not reach a total of 200 until their 17th match in 1895–96, when they made 207 against Wellington in a drawn match. Their first individual century came in 1897–98, when Hugh Lusk made 119 against Canterbury. However, low scores were the norm in New Zealand at the time: in the eight first-class matches in 1897–98, only two centuries were scored, Lusk's and one by another Hawke's Bay batsman, Jack Wolstenholme.

Hawke's Bay played 53 first-class matches, for 11 wins, 35 losses and seven draws. Twenty-four of those matches were against their neighbours, Wellington; Hawke's Bay won six of these and lost 14. They lost both their Plunket Shield matches (against Canterbury in 1914–15 and Auckland in 1920–21) by an innings.

Leading players
Hugh Lusk made three of Hawke's Bay's five centuries. He was by far Hawke's Bay's outstanding batsman: in 28 matches he scored 1395 runs at an average of 28.46, and also took 40 wickets at 22.85, as well as captaining the side in most of his matches and representing New Zealand.

The highest score for Hawke's Bay was 134 against Wellington in 1914–15 by Jack Board, the English Test player who coached in Hawke's Bay for several seasons before World War I. The best innings bowling figures were 9 for 47 by Tom Dent against Wellington in 1900–01, and the best match figures were 13 for 33 (7 for 20 and 6 for 13) by Charles Smith in the second match against Taranaki in 1891–92.

Since 1920–21
Along with Southland, Hawke's Bay lost their first-class status after the 1920–21 season, leaving just four first-class teams in New Zealand: Auckland, Canterbury, Otago and Wellington. In reorganising domestic first-class cricket, the New Zealand Cricket Council chose only those teams that could afford to travel to take part in an annual round robin tournament for the Plunket Shield.

Hawke's Bay have won the Hawke Cup 11 times. Their first victory was in 1946–47, and their most recent in 2020–21. In the 1920s Hawke's Bay played several overseas teams in non-first-class matches, including Australia, the MCC, New South Wales, Queensland and the Melbourne Cricket Club, all at Nelson Park.

In 1950–51 the Central Districts cricket team began competing at first-class level in the Plunket Shield. The Hawke's Bay Cricket Association is one of Central Districts' constituent associations.

Grounds
Hawke's Bay played first-class matches on the following four home grounds:

 Recreation Ground, Napier
 Farndon Park, Clive
 Nelson Cricket Ground, Hastings
 Nelson Park, Napier

As well as Nelson Cricket Ground and Nelson Park, Hawke's Bay has also used the following grounds for Hawke Cup matches:

 McLean Park, Napier
 Cornwall Park, Hastings
 Anderson Park, Havelock North
 Forest Gate Domain, Ongaonga 

McLean Park has also been a regular home ground for Central Districts since 1951–52, and has been used as a Test ground since 1978–79. Nelson Park has also been used by Central Districts since 1985–86.

Notes

References

External links
 First-class matches played by Hawke's Bay
 Other matches played by Hawke's Bay 
 Hawke's Bay Cricket Association website

1852 establishments in New Zealand
Cricket teams in New Zealand
Cricket in Central Districts
Sport in the Hawke's Bay Region
Former senior cricket clubs in New Zealand
Cricket clubs established in 1852